This is a list of airlines of Saskatchewan which have an Air Operator's Certificate issued by Transport Canada, the country's civil aviation authority. These are airlines that are based in Saskatchewan.

Current airlines

Defunct airlines

References

Saskatchewan
Aviation in Saskatchewan
Airlines